Nicaragua participated at the 2018 Summer Youth Olympics in Buenos Aires, Argentina from 6 October to 18 October 2018.

Rowing

Nicaragua was given a quota to compete in rowing.

 Boys' single sculls - 1 athlete

Taekwondo

Weightlifting

Nicaragua was given a quota by the tripartite committee to compete in weightlifting.

 Girls' events - 1 quota (not used)

References

2018 in Nicaraguan sport
Nations at the 2018 Summer Youth Olympics
Nicaragua at the Youth Olympics